Robert (Bob) Gaussen is a former Produce and Grocery Industry Ombudsman appointed by the Australian Government. He served under contract to the Government for five and a half years. He is currently the Managing Director of Adjudicate Today and Review Today.

References 

Living people
Year of birth missing (living people)